The 2007–08 Midland Football Alliance season was the 14th in the history of Midland Football Alliance, a football competition in England.

Clubs and league table
The league featured 19 clubs from the previous season, along with three new clubs:
Coventry Sphinx, promoted from the Midland Football Combination
Shifnal Town, promoted from the West Midlands (Regional) League
Stapenhill, promoted from the Leicestershire Senior League

League table

References

External links
 Midland Football Alliance

2007–08
9